Yuka Okamoto (born 20 September 1997) is a Japanese professional footballer who plays as a midfielder for WE League club AC Nagano Parceiro Ladies.

Club career 
Okamoto made her WE League debut on 18 September 2021.

References 

Living people
1997 births
Women's association football midfielders
WE League players
Japanese women's footballers
AC Nagano Parceiro Ladies players
Association football people from Tokyo